Aubignan is a commune in the Vaucluse department in the Provence-Alpes-Côte d'Azur region in southeastern France. Close to Beaumes-de-Venise and the famous Côtes du Rhône vineyards, Aubignan is, itself, locally famous for the production of wine, and of young vines and vine grafts.

Geography 
The village is located to the North of Carpentras, and is part of the Comtat Venaissin. It is built on a hill.

History

Twin towns
The commune is twinned with Cheseaux-sur-Lausanne, Switzerland, and Barrow-and-Littleton, United Kingdom.

Population 
In 2017, there were 5,661 inhabitants, an increase of 7,95 % compared to 2012.

Public transport 
The village is served by two bus lines, run by Trans'Cove: line A and line J. The three most important railway stations are Avignon, Orange and Carpentras.

Places of interest 
 canal of Carpentras
 fountain and old wash house
 Moulin-Neuf pond
 France Gate, part of the ancient town walls
 Parish Church (Notre-Dame-de-l'Annonciation-et-Saint-Victor-Martyr)
 St. Sixte Chapel

Notable people 
 François Arnaud (1721-1784), Abbot and writer, born in Aubignan, member or the Académie française
 Louis Guichard (1866-1951), politician, born in Aubignan
 Maxime Richaud (1924-1994), painter, born in Aubignan
 Ibrahim Shahda (1929-1991), painter, who worked in Aubignan.

See also
Communes of the Vaucluse department

References

External links
http://www.ot-aubignan.fr/

Communes of Vaucluse